The latest version of Qt is 6.4.2 released on 5 January 2023.

Also still supported, for commercial users, are 5.15 LTS, released on 26 May 2020, and 6.2 LTS, released on 30 September 2021 – long-term support (LTS) versions are generally supported for three years, with a commercial license, while 5.15 support was extended to five years, so it is supported for longer or until 26 May 2025. In addition the KDE project provides unofficial support for, at least, Qt 5.15, i.e. not just for commercial users.

A regular release only receives patch releases during the first 6 months, until the next feature release is out, while an LTS release receives patch releases also after the next feature release is available.

Starting with 5.15 LTS, LTS releases are available only to the commercial license holders. For open source users, such LTS releases are available as regular releases only, thus 5.15 is now in the commercial-only LTS phase. Qt 5.12 LTS was the last Qt version to offer an offline installer. Qt 6.5 will be the next LTS version.

Pre-releases and Qt 1

Qt 2

Qt 3

Qt 4
Qt 4 was first released in 2005 and has been unsupported since 2015.

Qt 5
Qt 5 was officially released on 19 December 2012. This new version marked a major change in the platform, with hardware-accelerated graphics, QML and JavaScript playing a major role. The traditional C++-only QWidgets continued to be supported, but did not benefit from the performance improvements available through the new architecture. Qt 5 brings significant improvements to the speed and ease of developing user interfaces.

Framework development of Qt 5 moved to open governance, taking place at qt-project.org. It is now possible for developers outside Digia to submit patches and have them reviewed.

The KDE project provides unofficial support for Qt 5.15 in the form of a collection of bugfix patches, most of which are backported from Qt 6. As KDE has a policy of not assigning version numbers to their patches, Linux distributions use ad-hoc schemes when using this fork of Qt5: OpenSUSE, for example, calls its June 2021 version "5.15.2+kde200".

Qt 6
Qt 6 was officially released on December 8, 2020.

Notes
  On 14 October 2016, KDE's 20th anniversary, a KDE developer re-released a variant of Qt 1.45 that he made work with modern Linux systems.

References

External links
 Qt downloads archive

Qt (software)
Software version histories